Edward Shouldham, DCL was an English priest and academic in the late 15th and early sixteenth centuries.

Shouldham was Rector of Therfield from 1485 and Master of Trinity Hall, Cambridge from 1502, holding both positions until his death in 1503.

References

Masters of Trinity Hall, Cambridge
15th-century English Roman Catholic priests
16th-century English Roman Catholic priests